The 2012–13 Prairie View A&M Panthers basketball team represented Prairie View A&M University during the 2012–13 NCAA Division I men's basketball season. The Panthers, led by seventh year head coach Byron Rimm II, played their home games at the William Nicks Building and were members of the Southwestern Athletic Conference. They finished the season 15–19, 8–10 in SWAC play to finish in a three-way tie for fifth place. They advanced to the championship game of the SWAC tournament where they lost to Southern.

Roster

Schedule

|-
!colspan=9| Regular season

|-
!colspan=9| 2013 SWAC Basketball tournament

References

Prairie View A&M Panthers basketball seasons
Prairie View AandM